Wyocena is the name of a town and a village in Columbia County, Wisconsin:

 Wyocena (town), Wisconsin
 Wyocena, Wisconsin, a village within the town of Wyocena